The 2018 IAAF World Half Marathon Championships took place on 24 March 2018 in Valencia, Spain. It was the 23rd edition of the event and the 2nd time it was held in Spain.

Netsanet Gudeta gave the standout performance of the competition, winning with a half marathon world record of 1:06:11 hours in a women-only race. This improved Lornah Kiplagat's eleven-year-old championships record by 14 seconds and marked a personal improvement of over a minute. She led the Ethiopian women (alongside fifth and sixth placers Zeineba Yimer and Meseret Belete) to the team title with a combined time of 3:22:27 hours. The outright world record holder Joyciline Jepkosgei settled for second and her third-placed compatriot Pauline Kaveke Kamulu helped Kenya to second in the team competition. The best performance by a non-African-born runner was by Romania's Ancuţa Bobocel, who set a personal best in 15th place.

In the men's race Kenya's Geoffrey Kipsang Kamworor took his third straight title in 1:00:02 hours (nearly a minute short of his championship record). Bahrain's Abraham Naibei Cheroben claimed the silver medal 20 seconds further back and Aron Kifle was the bronze medallist around half a minute short of the winner. The winning men's team, Ethiopia, contained no medallists but Jemal Yimer, Getaneh Molla and Betesfa Getahun rounded out the top six. The best non-African-born performer was Julien Wanders of Switzerland who managed eighth place in 1:01:03 hours.	

A total of 151 men (including 23 teams) finished the distance, with five men failing to finish the distance and three entrants being non-starters. A total of 122 women (including 19 teams) entered and started the race, with 117 finishers. Seven men's and seven women's national records were broken at the competition. Abdelaziz Guerziz of Algeria finished in 61st place but he was disqualified for four years in February 2019 with his results from 6 February 2018 onwards being disqualified.

Sopot, Poland was defeated in the bidding process. Copenhagen, Denmark was also in the running to host.

In conjunction with the men's elite race, an open half marathon was held on the same course for 14,577 competitors.

Medallists

Race results
Results for the men's and women's elite races are shown below. Results for the open race are kept separately.

Men

Women

Team standings

Men

Women

Medal table (unofficial)

Participation
An unofficial count yields the participation of 279 athletes from 79 countries and the Athlete Refugee Team, which is a record for this event.

 (1)
 (4)
 (3)
 (3)
 (1)
Athlete Refugee Team (2)
 (5)
 (3)
 (9)
 (4)
 (1)
 (1)
 (1)
 (8)
 (1)
 (1)
 (2)
 (5)
 (1)
 (1)
 (2)
 (4)
 (1)
 (2)
 (2)
 (6)
 (3)
 (1)
 (10)
 (1)
 (10)
 (10)
 (1)
 (1)
 (7)
 (10)
 (3)
 (10)
 (6)
 (4)
 (1)
 (9)
 (1)
 (8)
 (8)
 (3)
 (1)
 (3)
 (2)
 (2)
 (2)
 (1)
 (3)
 (1)
 (1)
 (1)
 (2)
 (2)
 (7)
 (6)
 (3)
 (1)
 (1)
 (1)
 (10)
 (10)
 (2)
 (1)
 (1)
 (1)
 (1)
 (1)
 (8)
 (2)
 (7)
 (2)
 (8)
 (1)
 (1)
 (2)

Notes

References

Results
Results Half Marathon Men. IAAF. Retrieved 2018-02-26.
Results Half Marathon Women. IAAF. Retrieved 2018-02-26.
Team Standings Half Marathon Men. IAAF. Retrieved 2018-02-26.
Team Standings Half Marathon Women. IAAF. Retrieved 2018-02-26.

World Athletics Half Marathon Championships
International athletics competitions hosted by Spain
Sports competitions in Valencia
IAAF World Half Marathon Championships
IAAF World Half Marathon Championships
IAAF World Half Marathon Championships